This article lists some of the students' unions in the United Kingdom that are not affiliated with the National Union of Students. Around five per cent of student unions in the UK are not affiliated with the NUS, including  of student unions who represent Russell Group Universities (the Aldwych Group). Some of the institutions have disaffiliated from the NUS, whereas others such as those in the previous Scottish Ancients Group (see: Coalition of Higher Education Students in Scotland) have never been affiliated.

Durham Students' Union voted to disaffiliate in March 2010 but subsequently voted to reaffiliate in January 2011. Oxford University Student Union was reported as having voted to disaffiliate in 2014, but this was overturned after voting irregularities were uncovered. Four unions voted to leave the national body in 2016 Lincoln, Newcastle, Hull and Loughborough (Lincoln later rejoined but has since again disaffiliated).
In 2022, Reading University Student Union voted to leave the national body  citing a lack of representation and concerns over the direction of the NUS. As of December 2022 Brighton Students' Union also decided to leave NUS stating that the NUS do not offer value for money.

Non-affiliated students' unions

 Open University Students Association Never affiliated.
 Glasgow University Students' Representative Council Formerly a member of the Scottish Union of Students (SUS) until it merged with the NUS in 1971.
 Glasgow University Union
 Queen Margaret Union
 Glasgow School of Art Students' Association Formerly a member of the SUS until it merged with the NUS in 1971.
 University of St Andrews Students' Association Formerly a member of the SUS, it joined the NUS but disaffiliated in 1975.
 Dundee University Students' Association Formerly a member of the SUS, it joined the NUS but disaffiliated in 1994.
 University of Southampton Students' Union Disaffiliated in 2002.
 Imperial College Union Disaffiliated in 2008.
 Cardiff Met SU Disaffiliated in 2009.
 Hull University Union Disaffiliated in 2016.
 Loughborough Students' Union (LSU) Disaffiliated in 2016.
 University of Surrey Students' Union (USSU) Disaffiliated in 2017.
 University of Essex Students' Union Disaffiliated in 2017.
 University of Plymouth Students' Union (UPSU) Disaffiliated in 2018.
 Queen Margaret University Students' Union (QMUSU) Disaffiliated in 2019.
 University of Portsmouth Student's Union Disaffiliated in 2019.
 University of Lincoln Students' Union Disaffiliated in 2019.
 University of Reading Student's Union Disaffiliated in 2022.
 Queen Mary University of London Student's Union Disaffiliated in 2022
 University of Brighton Students' Union Disaffiliated in 2022.
 University of Warwick Students' Union to disaffiliate after a vote in February 2023

See also
 List of students' unions in the United Kingdom

Notes

References

National Union of Students (United Kingdom)
NUS